Brandon Allen Hightower (born March 17, 1998) is an American professional racing driver who currently competes racing sprint cars. He has also raced stock cars, driving in the NASCAR Xfinity Series for MBM Motorsports, JP Motorsports and JD Motorsports, and the NASCAR Camping World Truck Series for MB Motorsports, Contreras Motorsports, B. J. McLeod Motorsports and TJL Motorsports.

Racing career

Early years
Starting at the age of 14, Hightower raced on local dirt tracks, eventually fostering a connection with NASCAR driver David Starr after a chance meeting at a truck stop.

Xfinity Series
Hightower made his NASCAR Xfinity Series debut in late 2016, driving the No. 13 for MBM Motorsports at Richmond International Raceway. After finishing 35th in the race, he ran six more for MBM to close out the season. His best finish was 25th, which came at Dover International Speedway. He ran three races in early 2017, also with MBM.

On May 22, 2018, it was announced that Hightower would take over JP Motorsports' No. 55 entry for the remainder of the 2018 NASCAR Xfinity Series season, replacing Stephen Leicht. Hightower drove seven races for the team before suddenly leaving the team; a lawsuit was eventually filed by Hightower against the team but was later dropped. Hightower later said that he would rather race sprint cars than pay $40,000 to drive stock cars like he was paying at JPM. Days later, Hightower announced that he would run the rest of the season's oval races with JD Motorsports, but Iowa was the only race that Hightower drove for JD.

Camping World Truck Series
In 2015, Hightower made his NASCAR Camping World Truck Series debut in 2015, driving for MB Motorsports at Martinsville Speedway. He finished 27th. One start in 2016, for Contreras Motorsports, yielded a crash at Talladega Superspeedway. Contreras Motorsports announced during the offseason that Hightower would drive full time. He was left without a ride, however, when Contreras shut down the team and sold the assets to D.J. Copp, who formed Copp Motorsports. Hightower returned to his dirt roots at Eldora in 2017, driving the number 1 truck for TJL Motorsports.

Motorsports career results

NASCAR
(key) (Bold – Pole position awarded by qualifying time. Italics – Pole position earned by points standings or practice time. * – Most laps led.)

Xfinity Series

Camping World Truck Series

 Season still in progress
 Ineligible for series points

References

External links
 
 

Living people
1998 births
NASCAR drivers
Racing drivers from Louisiana